The 2012 Olympic Wrestling African & Oceania Qualification Tournament was the first regional qualifying tournament for the 2012 Olympics.

The top two wrestlers in each weight class earn a qualification spot for their nation.

Men's freestyle

55 kg
16 March

60 kg
16 March

66 kg
16 March

74 kg
16 March

84 kg
16 March

 Miligy Ahmed originally qualified for the Olympics, but was later disqualified for doping, giving the spot to Mohamed Riad Louafi.

96 kg
16 March

120 kg
17 March

Men's Greco-Roman

55 kg
17 March

60 kg
17 March

66 kg
17 March

74 kg
17 March

84 kg
17 March

96 kg
18 March

120 kg
18 March

Women's freestyle

48 kg
18 March

55 kg
18 March

63 kg
18 March

72 kg
18 March

References

External links
UWW Database

Africa
Olympic Q African
W
Wrestling Championships